Dragon Motor can refer to any of the following:

 Dragon (Russian car company)
 Dragon Automobile Company
 Dragon Motor Company